Ruyuan may refer to:

Ruyuan Yao Autonomous County, in Guangdong, China
Ruyuan (abbess) (died 775), Tang dynasty abbess